Breiðdalshreppur is a former municipality in Iceland. In 2018, it merged with a larger municipality, the neighboring Fjarðabyggð.

Its service centre was Breiðdalsvík. Tourism, fishing, sheep and cow farming were the most prominent industries in the municipality.

References

Municipalities of Iceland